The Gloucestershire Warwickshire Steam Railway (GWR, GWSR or Gloucs-Warks Steam Railway) is a volunteer-run heritage railway which runs along the Gloucestershire/Worcestershire border of the Cotswolds, England.

The most recent extension to Broadway (completed in 2018) involved the company raising £1.38 million. The 28 mile round trip on steam and heritage diesel trains follows part of the route of the former Great Western main line from Birmingham to Cheltenham.

Overview
The line was originally part of the Great Western Railway's Cheltenham–Stratford-upon-Avon–Birmingham line, known as the Honeybourne Line, built in 1900–1906, and runs through the Cotswold towns of Winchcombe and Bishop's Cleeve. The line was run down over the years and finally closed after a derailment damaged a stretch of track in 1976, with the double track being lifted from 1979.

In 1987 the line was restored as far as Winchcombe where the station was reconstructed using the former Monmouth Troy station building. The latest extension of the line, to Broadway, opened in March 2018.

The GWSR runs trains from March to the end of December, with the line closing during January and February as well as November for line and locomotive maintenance. The GWSR runs regular train services every weekend plus most weekdays from Easter to the end of October, and some weekends are used to host special events including steam and diesel galas, Wartime in the Cotswolds, Real Ale Weekends and Santa Specials.

The railway operates a wide variety of both steam and heritage diesel locomotives, as well as heritage DMUs. These have included the world-famous locomotive 4472 "Flying Scotsman" and equally famous 3440 "City of Truro", which in 1904 was the first engine to reach 100 mph. In 2021 the resident steam locomotives on the line were 7820 "Dinmore Manor", 28xx class 2807 (undergoinmg 10-year overhaul), 42xx class 4270, 7903 "Foremarke Hall" and 35006 "Peninsular & Oriental SN Co". To complement the running stock a collection of over 210 carriages and wagons of various origins has been compiled, many of which are still being restored.

The GWSR opened its extension to Broadway, Worcestershire to the public on 30 March 2018.

Since December 2021, the railway has returned to running a standard timetable in accordance with the removal of Coronavirus restrictions.

Signalling of the Heritage GWSR
The route consists of single line sections with passing places at the major stations.  All stations and loops are signalled using GWR Lower Quadrant Semaphore Signals.

The signalling on the line is a mixture of Electric Key Token and One Train Staff working, depending on operational requirements. Current sections are:
 Broadway–Toddington (One Train Staff) - will be Track-circuit block (TCB) when Broadway box opens
 Toddington–Winchcombe (EKT)
 Winchcombe-Gotherington (EKT)
 Gotherington-Cheltenham Race Course (EKT)
 Winchcombe–Cheltenham Race Course (EKT) (With Gotherington switched out)
 Toddington–Cheltenham Race Course (One Train Staff - with Winchcombe and Gotherington switched out and Cheltenham Race Course behaving as a ground frame)

There are four signal boxes along the line, and a new-built platform mounted one at Broadway, with the frame parts all acquired and assembled:
 Broadway – currently non-operational
 Toddington – operational
 Winchcombe – operational
 Gotherington – operational
 Cheltenham Race Course – operational

Stations

Future development plans

South to Cheltenham 

Encouraged by support from Cheltenham Borough Council, which has both given the railway direct funds and placed protected status on the former line's trackbed south from Cheltenham Race Course to Cheltenham Spa, the railway could at some point connect to Network Rail in the south.

The Council has backed the long term scheme, as this would allow the railway to:
 be reinstated as an access point for race-goers from all across the UK to easily access meetings at Cheltenham Racecourse, and reduce resultant current traffic congestion
 build a new halt in the Wyman's Brook area of Cheltenham itself, to serve an adjacent Prince of Wales sports stadium
 run tourist and excursion trains to access the railway and the town

Although the GWSR has extended track to (and through) Hunting Butts tunnel, a few hundred yards beyond Cheltenham Race Course station, it owns the trackbed as far as the Prince of Wales stadium at Wyman's Brook. It is likely that after completion of its extension to Broadway, laying track further into Cheltenham will happen to this point; a distance of about 1 mile. However, beyond here major and costly engineering works would be required to extend the trackbed further south.

The primary impediments are a) a bowstring bridge over Honeybourne Way (located at ), built in 2002 to allow continued access by bicycle along the old trackbed alignment to Cheltenham Leisure Centre when planning permission was given for the redevelopment of the former  station site as a Waitrose supermarket; the resulting bowstring bridge follows a section of former railway embankment, which was removed to provide road access to the new store; and b) the reduced-height pedestrian specification bridge carrying the footpath/railbed beneath the very busy St Georges Road, which would have to be replaced to allow trains to pass beneath the road. There is land space beside the bowstring bridge to allow a railway to be built beside it, but there is no way of avoiding the work necessary to get rail vehicles beneath St Georges Road.

Between Broadway and Honeybourne
GWSR (Gloucestershire Warwickshire Railway) could buy the trackbed between Broadway and Honeybourne to protect it from future non-GWSR developments. The trackbed is 4.5 miles long and the bridges have not been removed or filled and there are no plans to fill or remove them. However, they are in a very poor state and would cost a significant amount to restore; additionally, the DfT has indicated that it would not grant permission for the GWSR to purchase the trackbed and to take on liability for the bridges.

North from Honeybourne
When the GWSR was first formed, it intended to purchase the entire line from Cheltenham Racecourse to Stratford Racecourse. However, when applying for the required Light Railway Order, the group was informed that they were unlikely to be granted the order for 25 miles when they had no experience of running a railway. A reduced application for the 15 miles from Cheltenham Race Course to Broadway was successful and track has since been laid and operations begun. Since this time, the section between Stratford and Stratford Racecourse has been utilised to improve road access around the town, especially the A4390, making reinstatement of rail to the main station at Stratford extremely difficult.

Landslips
In the early 2010s the GWSR was affected by two major landslips in embankments on the line, which severed the preserved line into separate sections; however, both slips have now been repaired, and the whole line has been fully reopened. A further landslip occurred in November 2019 just south of Gotherington station, but has now been repaired.

2010 (Gotherington)
In April 2010 the GWSR suffered a landslip of an embankment near Gotherington. Train services continued despite the Gotherington landslip, but over a reduced route.  The landslip forced the closure of the line south of Gotherington, including Cheltenham Race Course Station, which was effectively cut off. The railway continued to operate services from Toddington to Gotherington, with a locomotive at both ends of the train ("top and tailed"), as it was not possible to run the locomotive around the train at Gotherington at the time (there is now a run round loop just south of Gotherington). The railway launched a £1m appeal, both to fund the rebuilding of the embankment, and also to undertake preventative maintenance to ensure that similar problems do not happen at other points along the line. It was deemed unlikely that the line south of Gotherington would reopen before July 2011, but donations ensured that the work could be carried out promptly, and it was reopened on 22 April 2011.

2011 (Chicken Curve)
In January 2011 the railway was damaged by another landslip just east of Winchcombe station at Chicken Curve. The landslip severed the railway in two; it was very similar to the one at Gotherington, but closer to the middle of the route. It was estimated that the cost of the repair work would be £850,000; funds for the repair were successfully raised.  During the repair period a DMU service was run from Toddington up to the extension at Laverton; since the earlier Gotherington slip had been repaired, steam trains ran from Winchcombe to Cheltenham Race Course, the steam locomotive maintenance facilities temporarily being transferred to Winchcombe. The Chicken Curve landslip was repaired over the summer of 2012, and the GWSR was once again operational as a single unified line from Cheltenham Race Course to the site of Laverton Halt, a total of 12 route miles in length at that time.

2019 (Gotherington)
Following extended heavy rain, one side of the embankment south of Gotherington station slipped. This was first discovered in November 2019, and worsened to the extent that no trains could run in January 2020. Following remedial works, the line reopened on 7 March 2020, in time for the regular Cheltenham race trains to run. Work is still ongoing to finish off the site. The total cost of repairs is expected to be £500,000; an emergency appeal has been issued to raise £250,000 towards this cost due to the closure of the line following the coronavirus (COVID-19) outbreak.

Steam locomotives

Operational

Undergoing restoration, repairs, overhaul, or construction

Stored or static

Diesel locomotives and DMUs

Operational

Non operational

Coaching stock
Operational coaches are shown in bold.

See also 
 North Gloucestershire Railway – a narrow gauge railway also at Toddington
 Stratford on Avon and Broadway Railway – a now defunct group that had initially hoped to restore the railway between Stratford upon Avon and Broadway.

References 

 Cotswold Line Promotion Group Includes proposal to link GWR to main line at Honeybourne
 About Britain Entry
 Cheltenham local attractions
 Reference in directory of Heritage Railways in the UK
 New bridge on the Honeybourne Line.

External links 

 Gloucestershire Warwickshire Steam Railway
 North Gloucestershire Narrow Gauge Railway
 Cotswold Steam Preservation Ltd. - Owners of No. 2807
 Warwickshire Railways

Heritage railways in Gloucestershire
Transport in Cheltenham